"Bertha Lou" is a rockabilly song, first recorded in 1957 by Johnny Faire. It was written by Johnny Burnette and John Marascalco. It was also recorded by Dorsey Burnette and Clint Miller; Miller's version reached #79 on the Billboard Hot 100 in 1958. Reworkings of the song such as "Twinkie Lee", "Snacky Poo", and Bob Dylan's "Rita May" followed.

1957 songs
Rockabilly songs
Songs written by Johnny Burnette
Songs written by John Marascalco